Statistics of Nemzeti Bajnokság I in the 1985–86 season.

Overview
It was contested by 16 teams, and Budapest Honvéd FC won the championship.

League standings

Results

Statistical leaders

Top goalscorers

References
Hungary - List of final tables (RSSSF)

Nemzeti Bajnokság I seasons
1985–86 in Hungarian football
Hun